Barez Rural District is in Manj District of Lordegan County, Chaharmahal and Bakhtiari province, Iran. At the census of 2006, its population was 8,024 in 1,495 households; there were 8,385 inhabitants in 1,795 households at the following census of 2011; and in the most recent census of 2016, the population of the rural district was 7,933 in 2,014 households. The largest of its 69 villages was Deh Now-ye Barez, with 1,171 people.

References 

Lordegan County

Rural Districts of Chaharmahal and Bakhtiari Province

Populated places in Chaharmahal and Bakhtiari Province

Populated places in Lordegan County